Thorsten Dauth (born March 11, 1968 in Bad Nauheim, Hessen) is a retired male decathlete from Germany. He set his personal best score (8164 points) in the men's decathlon on May 28, 1995 at the Hypo-Meeting in Götzis.

Achievements

External links

sports-reference

1968 births
Living people
German decathletes
Olympic athletes of Germany
Athletes (track and field) at the 1992 Summer Olympics
World Athletics Championships athletes for Germany
People from Bad Nauheim
Sportspeople from Darmstadt (region)